Higher Menadew (meaning black hill) is a farm west of Luxulyan  in Cornwall, England.

See also

 List of farms in Cornwall

References

Farms in Cornwall